NCIS: The Official TV Soundtrack is a series of soundtrack albums featuring music used in the CBS television series NCIS. The first volume in the series, released on February 10, 2009, received attention for its method of compiling music for the album; show producers and writers were presented previously unreleased tracks from popular artists "ranging from Perry Farrell to Jakob Dylan as the shows were being crafted, and then taking inspiration from those tunes to help craft the show." This method contrasted with the norm for TV soundtracks, which tend to be compilations of previously released music that is already available individually or on other albums. NCIS: The Official TV Soundtrack – Vol. 2 was released on November 3, 2009, according to
Amazon.com.

Volume 1

Overview
NCIS: The Official TV Soundtrack is the first soundtrack album from the television series NCIS. The album is a two-disc, 22-track set that includes brand new songs from artists featured prominently in  episodes of the series. According to the soundtrack website, NCIS show producers listened to literally dozens of submitted tracks before choosing the ones best suited for upcoming storylines, and from which the show's writers could draw upon for inspiration. The soundtrack also features NCIS stars Pauley Perrette ("Abby Sciuto"), who performs the self-composed "Fear" under the moniker Stop Making Friends, and  Cote de Pablo ("Ziva David"), whose memorable performance of Tom Waits' "Temptation" from the Season 6 premiere episode, "Last Man Standing," is included. It is Perrette’s character, Abby, whose music sensibilities in the show serve as the basis for the soundtrack’s "Abby’s Lab" disk 2.

Track listing

Songs used in NCIS episodes

Volume 2

Overview
NCIS: The Official TV Soundtrack – Vol. 2 is the second soundtrack album from the television series NCIS. The album is a 12-track set that includes brand new and exclusive songs from artists featured prominently in 2009-2010 episodes of the series, including Bob Dylan whose newly remixed and mastered "California" from the artist's Bringing It All Back Home sessions marks the first commercial release of this track. John Mellencamp's "Someday The Rains Will Fall" was recorded during the summer of 2009 in room 636 of the Gunter Hotel in San Antonio, Texas – the same room blues legend Robert Johnson recorded many of his classic songs in 1936. NCIS star Michael Weatherly (Special Agent Anthony DiNozzo) contributes his own "Bitter And Blue", specifically recorded for the soundtrack album. Norah Jones, Joss Stone, Sick Puppies, Sharon Little, Sheryl Crow, Keaton Simons, and Saosin all contribute new and exclusive tracks. Otis Redding's "I've Got Dreams To Remember" and Tom Lehrer's "The Elements," both utilized in previous season's episodes, round out the album.

Track listing

Songs used in NCIS episodes

Volume 3

Overview
NCIS: The Official TV Score is the third soundtrack album from the television series NCIS. NCIS composer Brian Kirk created each of the album's 14 tracks by mixing various musical pieces from the show's episodes into standalone suites of music. The resulting album presents the NCIS music in a cohesive format designed to be listened to as fans would any of their favorite albums.

Track listing

Volume 4

Overview
NCIS: Benchmark – The Official TV Soundtrack is the fourth soundtrack album from the television series NCIS. The album consists of 14 tracks used in the show.

Track listing

References

External links

 ncismusic.com – Web site of NCIS: The Official TV Soundtrack
 numeriklab.com – Web site of the composers of the main title theme from NCIS
 "CBS finds new ways to use tunes", Phil Gallo, Variety

Soundtrack
Television soundtracks
2009 soundtrack albums